Kota, Nepal may refer to:
 Kot, Bhojpur
 Kota, Tanahun